Vale of York was a county constituency represented in the House of Commons of the Parliament of the United Kingdom. It elected one Member of Parliament (MP) by the first past the post system of election.

History
The constituency was created in 1997 from parts of the seats of Ryedale, Harrogate, Skipton and Ripon, & Richmond (Yorks). It was abolished in 2010.

Boundaries
The District of Hambleton wards of Bedale, Carlton Miniott, Crakehall, Crayke, Easingwold, Helperby, Hillside, Huby-Sutton, Leemming, Shipton, Sowerby, Stillington, Tanfield, The Thorntons, Thirsk, Tollerton, Topcliffe, and Whitestonecliffe, the District of Ryedale wards of Clifton Without, Haxby North East, Haxby West, New Earswick, Rawcliffe, Skelton, and Wigginton, and the Borough of Harrogate wards of Boroughbridge, Claro, Marston Moor, Nether Poppleton, Newby, Ouseburn, Spofforth, Upper Poppleton, and Wathvale.

This constituency covered the more northerly parts of the Vale of York and included the north-western suburbs of York and the market towns of Easingwold, Bedale, Boroughbridge and Thirsk. The three largest settlements were from the York suburbs.

The reconfiguration of North Yorkshire's constituencies by the Boundary Commission for England saw the creation of a York Central and a York Outer. The populous York suburbs became part of York Outer. Easingwold, Thirsk and surrounding villages joined rural Ryedale to form a new Thirsk and Malton constituency. Bedale rejoined the Richmond constituency.  Boroughbridge became part of an enlarged Harrogate seat, while Skipton & Ripon regained some of the surrounding villages. The enlarged Selby and Ainsty seat now encompasses Marston Moor and Spofforth.

Members of Parliament

Elections

Elections in the 2000s

Elections in the 1990s

See also
 List of parliamentary constituencies in North Yorkshire

Notes and references 

Constituencies of the Parliament of the United Kingdom established in 1997
Constituencies of the Parliament of the United Kingdom disestablished in 2010
Politics of North Yorkshire
Parliamentary constituencies in Yorkshire and the Humber (historic)